Rannaküla was a village (until 2017) in Laimjala Parish, Saare County in western Estonia.

References

Villages in Saare County